The Old Nupe Market or the Old Dutch Market is a historic, European-built structure in Matara, Sri Lanka.

Building
The building was built in the late eighteenth century, probably by the British, but possibly by the Dutch. It was used to house the Nupe market.

The open-sided market building was constructed in a 'T' shape, with the upper bars of the T running parallel with the road and providing the entrance. The  pitched roof is tiled in red Sinhala Kandyan period clay tiles (peti-ulu) and supported by large white stone pillars. The supporting wooden frame of the roof is elaborate and edged with lavish latticework. One wing would have housed the vegetable market, the other wing meat and fish. The stem of the T was mostly likely to have been used for the sale of textiles and household items.

See also
 List of Dutch colonial buildings in Sri Lanka

References

Nupe Market
Nupe Market
Archaeological protected monuments in Matara District